Ülkü Park, also known as the Pınarbaşı Racing Circuit or İzmir Ülkü Racing Circuit, is a motor sports race track in the Pınarbaşı neighborhood of Bornova district in İzmir, Turkey. It was inaugurated in 1997.

With its  length, it is Turkey's second longest race track following Istanbul Park.

In addition to the asphalt course, which hosts auto and motorcycle and karting races, there are two more small-sized go-kart courses and a paintball playing field inside the main track. The facility includes open and covered stands, a 28-shop paddock, an exhibition area with halls in different sizes, a VIP lounge, training halls and a cafeteria.

Major motorsports events
The venue host regularly:
 Turkish Formula Three Championship
 Turkish Touring Car Championship
 Turkish Motorcycle Grand Prix
 Turkish Karting Championship

References

Sports venues in İzmir
Motorsport venues in Turkey
Bornova District
1997 establishments in Turkey
Sports venues completed in 1997